Several earthquakes have occurred in Chilean territory in 2010:

 2010 Chile earthquake (also called the Maule earthquake), the 8.8 magnitude earthquake on 27 February 2010 off the coast of Maule, which killed more than 500 people.
 2010 first Pichilemu earthquake, the 6.9 magnitude earthquake on 11 March 2010 on the coast of Pichilemu 
 2010 first Biobío earthquake, the 6.7 magnitude earthquake on 15 March 2010 off the coast of Biobio
 2010 third Biobío earthquake, the 6.2 magnitude on 23 April 2010 in Biobío
 2010 second Pichilemu earthquake, the 6.0 magnitude on 2 May 2010 on the coast of Pichilemu
 2010 second Biobío earthquake, the 5.9 magnitude earthquake on 2 April 2010 in Biobío
 2010 Pichilemu earthquakes, the 5.9 magnitude earthquake that occurred on September 29, 2010 near Lolol.

2010 in Chile
Chile 2010